Pembina Hills may refer to:
 Pembina Escarpment, a landform in South Dakota, North Dakota, and Manitoba
 Pembina Hills Regional Division No. 7, a school board in Alberta

See also 
 Pembina (disambiguation)